Ashʿarism or Ashʿarī theology is one of the main Sunnī schools of Islamic theology, founded by the Arab Muslim scholar, Shāfiʿī jurist, reformer (mujaddid), and scholastic theologian Abū al-Ḥasan al-Ashʿarī in the 9th–10th century. It established an orthodox guideline based on scriptural authority, rationality, and theological rationalism.

Al-Ashʿarī established a middle way between the doctrines of the Atharī and Muʿtazila schools of Islamic theology, based both on reliance on the sacred scriptures of Islam and theological rationalism concerning the agency and attributes of God. Ashʿarism eventually became the predominant school of theological thought within Sunnī Islam, and is regarded as the single most important school of Islamic theology in the history of Islam.

The disciples of the Ashʿarī school are known as Ashʿarites, and the school is also referred to as the Ashʿarite school, which became one of the dominant theological schools within Sunnī Islam. Ashʿarī theology is considered one of the orthodox creeds of Sunnī Islam, alongside the Atharī and Māturīdī. Amongst the most famous Ashʿarite theologians are Imam Nawawi, Ibn Hajar al-Asqalani, Ibn al-Jawzi, al-Ghazali, al-Suyuti, Izz al-Din ibn 'Abd al-Salam, Fakhr al-Din al-Razi, Ibn 'Asakir, al-Subki, al-Taftazani, al-Baqillani and al-Bayhaqi. Scholars and scientists who were affiliated with the Ashari school included Al-Biruni, Ibn al-Haytham, Ibn al-Nafis and Ibn Khaldun.

History

Founder 
Abū al-Ḥasan al-Ashʿarī was born in Basra, Iraq, and was a descendant of Abū Mūsa al-Ashʿarī, which belonged to the first generation of Muhammad's closest companions (ṣaḥāba). As a young man he studied under al-Jubba'i, a renowned teacher of Muʿtazilite theology and philosophy. He was noted for his teachings on atomism, among the earliest Islamic philosophies, and for al-Ashʿarī this was the basis for propagating the view that God created every moment in time and every particle of matter. He nonetheless believed in free will, elaborating the thoughts of Dirar ibn 'Amr and Abu Hanifa into a "dual agent" or "acquisition" (iktisab) account of free will.

While al-Ashʿarī opposed the views of the rival Muʿtazilite school, he was also opposed to the view which rejected all debate, held by certain schools such as the Zahiri ("literalist"), Mujassimite ("anthropotheist"), and Muhaddithin ("traditionalist") schools for their over-emphasis on taqlid (imitation) in his Istihsan al‑Khaud:

Development 
Ashʿarism became the main school of early Islamic philosophy whereby it was initially based on the foundations laid down by al-Ashʿarī, who founded the Ashʿarite school in the 10th century based on the methodology taught to him by his teacher Abdullah ibn Sa'eed ibn Kullaab. However, the Ashʿarite school underwent many changes throughout history, resulting in the term Ashʿarī being extremely broad in its modern usage (e.g. differences between Ibn Furak (d. AH 406) and al-Bayhaqi (d. AH 384)).

For example, the Ashʿarite view was that comprehension of the unique nature and characteristics of God were beyond human capability. The solution proposed by al-Ashʿarī to solve the problems of tashbih and ta'til concedes that the Supreme Being possesses in a real sense the divine attributes and names mentioned in the Quran. Insofar as these names and attributes have a positive reality, they are distinct from the essence, but nevertheless they don't have either existence or reality apart from it.

The inspiration of al-Ashʿarī in this matter was on the one hand to distinguish essence and attribute as concepts, and on the other hand to see that the duality between essence and attribute should be situated not on the quantitative but on the qualitative level — something which Muʿtazilite thinking had failed to grasp. Ashʿarite theologians were referred to as the muthbita ("those who make firm") by the Muʿtazilites.

Beliefs 

Two popular sources for Asharism creeds are Maqalat al-Islamiyyin and Ibana'an Usul al-Diyana.

God  and God's attributes 
Ashʿarites also hold beliefs about God's attributes that are unique to them, such as:
 Existence;
 Permanence without beginning;
 Endurance without end;
 Absoluteness and independence;
 Dissimilarity to created things;
 Oneness;
 God is all-powerful, willful, knowing, living, seeing, hearing, and speaking (signifying attributes).

God and relationship with humans 
The Ashʿarī school of Islamic theology holds that:
 God is all-powerful (omnipotent).
 good is what God commands – as revealed in the Quran and the ḥadīth — and is by definition just; evil is what God forbids and is likewise unjust. Right and wrong are in no way determined intuitively or naturally, they are not objective realities.
 Because of Divine omnipotence, there are no "natural laws" (of things like thermodynamics or gravity), because such laws would put limitations on His actions. There are, however, Divine "customs", whereby "certain so-called 'effects'" usually follow certain "causes" in the natural world.
 Also because of Divine power, all human acts—even the decision to raise a finger—are created by God. This had caused controversy earlier in Islamic history because human acts are what humans are judged for when being sent to heaven (jannah) or hell (Jahannam). Ashʿaris reconciled the doctrines of free will, justice, and divine omnipotence, with their own doctrine of kasb ("acquisition"),  by which human beings "'acquire' responsibility for their actions, although these "actions are willed and created by God". Humans still possess free will (or, more accurately, freedom of intention) under this doctrine, although their freedom is limited to the power to decide between the given possibilities God has created.   (This doctrine is now known in Western philosophy as occasionalism.)
 The Quran is the uncreated word of God, that is, it was not created by God, but like God has always been. It can also be said to be created when it takes on a form in letters or sound.
 The unique nature and attributes of God cannot be understood fully by human reason and the physical senses.
 Reason is God-given and must be employed over source of knowledge.
 Intellectual inquiry is decreed by the Quran and the Islamic prophet Muhammad, therefore the interpretation (tafsīr) of the Quran and the ḥadīth should keep developing with the aid of older interpretations.
 Only God knows the heart, who belongs to the faithful and who does not.
 God has "absolute freedom" to "punish or reward as He wills", and so may forgive the sins of those in Hell.
 Support of kalām (rationalistic Islamic theology).

Prophets and the unseen 
Ashʿarites further affirm that Muslims must believe:
 in all the prophets and messengers of Islam, from Adam to Muhammad
 Jesus will return to earth and defeat the Dajjal
 and in the angels.
 including the angels of the grave (Munkar and Nakir)
 that Satan tempts man, contrarily to the Mu'tazila and Jahmiyya (the mention of the latter two branches only appears in Ibana).
 in the reality of paradise and hell.
 that prayers for dead Muslims and almsgiving reach them.
 During sleep, visions can be seen and they have an interpretation ("interpretation" only found in Ibana)
 the existence of sorcerers and that magic is a reality in the world.

Later Ashʿarism 

Nicholas Heer writes that later Ashʿarite theologians "increasingly attempted to rationalize Islamic doctrine" from about the 12th century onwards. Theologians such as al-Taftāzānī and al-Jurjānī  argued that the Islamic sacred scriptures (the Quran and the ḥadīth) "must be proven to be true by rational arguments" before being "accepted as the basis of the religion". Educated Muslims "must be convinced on the basis of rational arguments" and not revelation that Islam is true. A series of rational proofs were developed by these Ashʿarite theologians, including proofs for "the following doctrines or propositions":
 the universe is originated;
 the universe has an originator or creator;
 the creator of the universe is knowing, powerful and willing;
 prophecy is possible;
 miracles are possible;
 miracles indicate the truthfulness of one who claims to be a prophet;
 Muhammad claimed to be a prophet and performed miracles.

Criticism 

The medieval Muslim scholar Ibn Taymiyyah criticised the Ashʿarī theology as (in the words of one historian, Jonathan A. C. Brown) "a Greek solution to Greek problems" that should "never" have concerned Muslims. Both Ibn Taymiyyah and Shah Waliullah Dehlawi rejected the lack of literalism in Ashʿarī "speculative theology" and advocated "straightforward acceptance of God's description of Himself".

In contrast, German scholar Eduard Sachau affirms that the Ashʿarī theology and its biggest defender, al-Ghazali, was too literal and responsible for the decline of Islamic science starting in the 10th century. Sachau stated that the two clerics were the only obstacle to the Muslim world becoming a nation of "Galileos, Keplers, and Newtons".

Ziauddin Sardar states that some of the greatest Muslim scientists of the Islamic Golden Age, such as Ibn al-Haytham and Abū Rayhān al-Bīrūnī, who were pioneers of the scientific method, were themselves followers of the Ashʿarī school of Islamic theology. Like other Ashʿarites who believed that faith or taqlid should be applied only to Islam and not to any ancient Hellenistic authorities, Ibn al-Haytham's view that taqlid should be applied only to the prophets and messengers of Islam and not to any other authorities formed the basis for much of his scientific skepticism and criticism against Ptolemy and other ancient authorities in his Doubts Concerning Ptolemy and Book of Optics.

See also 
 2016 international conference on Sunni Islam in Grozny
 2020 International Maturidi Conference
 Islamic schools and branches
 List of Ash'aris and Maturidis
 List of prominent Ash'aris

Notes

Bibliography

External links 
 Who are the Ash'arites? Dar al-Iftaa Al-Missriyyah
 The Ash'ari's School of Theology Dar al-Iftaa Al-Missriyyah
 Ashariyys – The Knights of Knowledge and the Pioneers of Success www.sunna.info

 
 
Sunni Islamic branches
Kalam
Islamic theology
Islamic philosophical schools
History of Islam